Tjeldsundet is a strait in Northern Norway. Tjeldsundet has been an important waterway for more than 1,000 years and was well known and used during the Viking Age.

The northern part is in Troms og Finnmark county between the municipalities of Harstad and Tjeldsund, while the southern part forms the border between Troms og Finnmark and Nordland counties between the municipalities of Tjeldsund and Lødingen. The southern entrance to the strait begins at the Ofotfjorden at the village of Lødingen and the town of Harstad is located at the northern entrance of the strait where it empties into the Vågsfjorden.

The Tjeldsund Bridge connects Hinnøya to the mainland by the E10 road, also known as King Olav's Road, part of which goes from the town of Harstad to Harstad/Narvik Airport, Evenes.

Media gallery

References

External links

Landforms of Nordland
Landforms of Troms og Finnmark
Straits of Norway
Harstad
Lødingen
Tjeldsund